William Paul (7 February 1866 – 23 October 1911) was a Scottish footballer who played for Partick Thistle and Scotland as a centre forward.

Career
Paul featured for Partick Thistle across three decades, with his statistics in competitive matches for the club standing at 127 goals in 218 appearances. As an amateur, he was free to play for other teams and assisted Queen's Park on several occasions, particularly in the 1890–91 season, also playing for the Clydesdale Harriers (today purely an athletics club but in that era also involved in football, its members including several of the west of Scotland's leading players).

He was capped three times by Scotland and scored five goals (including four in one match in 1890).

Personal life 
Paul also worked as a shipwright at the Glasgow dockyards. He died in 1911, at age 45, from an appendix-related ailment. He was buried in the Western Necropolis in Maryhill.

See also
 List of Scotland national football team hat-tricks

References

External links

International goals at Londonhearts.com
IFFHS

Scottish footballers
Scotland international footballers
Scottish Football League players
Partick Thistle F.C. players
Queen's Park F.C. players
1911 deaths
1866 births
Footballers from Glasgow
Association football forwards
People from Partick